The BET Award for Best Actor is awarded to actors from both television and film. Some nominees have been nominated based on their performances in multiple bodies of work within the eligibility period. Denzel Washington and Michael B. Jordan hold the record for most wins in this category with three.

Winners and nominees
Winners are listed first and highlighted in bold.

2000s

2010s

2020s

Multiple wins and nominations

Wins

 3 wins
 Denzel Washington
 Michael B. Jordan

 2 wins
 Chadwick Boseman
 Idris Elba
 Jamie Foxx
 Will Smith
 Terrence Howard

Nominations

 13 nominations
 Denzel Washington

 9 nominations
 Idris Elba

 7 nominations
 Don Cheadle
 Jamie Foxx

 6 nominations
 Samuel L. Jackson

 5 nominations
 Anthony Anderson
 Michael B. Jordan
 Forest Whitaker

 4 nominations
 Eddie Murphy
 Will Smith

 3 nominations
 Chadwick Boseman
 Common
 Morgan Freeman
 Omari Hardwick
 Kevin Hart
 Terrence Howard

 2 nominations
 Sterling K. Brown
 Damson Idris
 Daniel Kaluuya
 Mos Def

See also
 BET Award for Best Actress

References

BET Awards